PureSystems is an IBM product line of factory pre-configured components and servers also being referred to as an "Expert Integrated System". The centrepiece of PureSystems is the IBM Flex System Manager in tandem with the so-called "Patterns of Expertise" for the automated configuration and management of PureSystems.

PureSystems can host four different operating systems (AIX, IBM i, Linux, Windows) and five hypervisors (Hyper-V, KVM, PowerVM, VMware, Xen) on two different instruction set architectures: Power ISA and x86. PureSystems is marketed as a converged system, which packages multiple information technology components into a single product.

Architecture 
The architecture itself is called IBM Flex System.

It aims at managing hybrid cloud infrastructure environments "out of the box".

The basic intention is for the combination of integrated hardware and software that can be easily maintained. A similar concept had already been introduced with the IBM AS/400. Today, such systems are called converged systems. More specialized integrated hardware and software are referred to as appliances.

The compute nodes of the server blades can be x86 or Power ISA and they can be used either individually or mixed in the same rack simultaneously, thus offering a hybrid ensemble which borrows from the zEnterprise/zBX ensemble (cf. a gameframe), including its ability to manage a combined physical/virtual hybrid environment from a single console.

PureSystems is shipped with the IBM Flex System Manager. It is an appliance which manages the resources according to the so-called "Patterns of Expertise", which provide field engineers' expertise from decades of system configuration.
These "Patterns of Expertise" offer industry-specific (e.g. banking, insurance, automotive) defaults for the fully automatic and optimal orchestration of resources (e.g. workload balancing). PureApplication uses in conjunction with the IBM System Manager first Flex repeatable software patterns (pattern) and industry-specific processes, which are derived from the year-long collaboration of IBM with their customers and business partners.

Platform 
The basic building block of the system is the 10U high Flex Enterprise system chassis with 14 bays in the front for compute nodes ("servers") and storage nodes.  Additionally, there are bays in the rear for I/O modules.

A flex-chassis can accommodate up to 14 horizontal compute and storage nodes in the front, and 4 vertically oriented switch modules in the rear. Contrasting to this, the IBM BladeCenter (9U high) has vertically oriented compute nodes ("blades"). This means that the components between the BladeCenter chassis and Flex chassis are not interchangeable.

Based upon the Flex Systems architecture (the components of which are individually available), there are three main products:
 PureFlex System (IaaS)
 PureApplication System (PaaS)
 PureData System (tightly coupled and specialized computer appliance / software appliance)

PureFlex
PureFlex is a factory pre-configured and combined hardware-/software system for IaaS in terms of cloud computing. It combines server, network and storage. IBM PureFlex is available in three configurations: Express, Standard, Enterprise.

PureApplication 
PureApplication is a pre-configured platform for platform as a service applications. It is optimized for transaction-oriented web and database applications. PureApplication comes with IBM DB2 database and WebSphere Application Server pre-configured so users can run their applications into a preconfigured middleware engine.

Unlike PureFlex, which is sold by IBM Systems and Technology Group (STG), PureApplication is marketed by the IBM Software Group (SWG).
IBM claims that PureApplication allows for installation (or deployment) of new applications within four hours.

The system's virtual pattern deployers encrypt on-disk data using Security First Corp's SPxBitFiler-IPS encryption technology, which is also licensed by IBM for its Cloud Data Encryption Service (ICDES).

IBM PureApplication System is available in three classes:
 W1500-32 and W1500-64, using Intel Xeon E5-2670 processors, housed in a 25U rack
 W1500-96 through to W1500-608, using Intel Xeon E5-2670  processors, housed in a 42U rack
 W1700-96 through to W1700-608, using IBM POWER7+ processors, housed in a 42U rack

PureData

PureData Systems takes the approach of PureApplication a step further being essentially a tightly coupled and specialized computer appliance and software appliance, the latter supporting both Oracle and DB2. It is thence marketed by the IBM Information Management Software, a brand of IBM Software Group (SWG).

PureData is focused at three main tasks within enterprise computing: business intelligence, near real-time data analysis and online transactional processing.
It comes in four flavours:
 PureData Systems for Transactions
 PureData Systems for Analytics
 PureData Systems for Operational Analytics
 PureData Systems for Hadoop

PureData System for Transactions is a highly reliable and scalable database platform.  It is aimed at e-commerce [i.e. retail and credit card processing environments) which depends on rapid handling of transactions and interactions. These transactions are small in size, but their sheer volume and frequency require a specialized environment. The new system can provide 5x performance improvement, partly through advances in high performance storage.

PureData System for Analytics builds on Netezza technology and it is aimed at business intelligence that entails huge queries with complex algorithms. It provides a large library of database analytical functions for data warehouse applications, and can scale across the terabyte or petabytes running on the system. It can support extremely high volume high speed analytics for clients (e.g. mobile phone carriers who want to identify potential churn and provide offers to retain customers).

PureData Systems for Operational Analytics is an operational warehouse system which supports real-time decision making. In contrast to PureData System for Analytics, which is aimed at handling large sets of data at a time, PureData for Operational Analytics is more or less a stream computing system that can analyze many small sets of data in real-time while PureData for Analytics will provide analysis only in hindsight, although with large sets of data.
Potential uses of PureData Systems for Operational Analytics are fraud detection or analysis of rapid fluctuations in supply-and-demand cycles.

PureData Systems for Hadoop H 1001 is a standards-based - so-called expert integrated - system which architecturally integrates IBM InfoSphere BigInsights, Hadoop-based software, server (IBM System x), and storage into a single appliance. Moreover, it integrates with IBM DB2, IBM Netezza, IBM PureData System for Analytics, and IBM InfoSphere Guardium.

Hardware

Compute Nodes

Intel based 
Compute nodes based on x86 processors from Intel.

x220 
 Flex System x220 compute node Type 7906
 Standard-width compute node
 Processors: Xeon E5-2400

x222 
 Flex System x220 compute node Type 7916
 Half-width compute node
 Processors: E5-2400

x240 
 Flex System x240 compute node Type 7162, 8737
 Standard-width compute node
 Processors: Type 7162: E5-2600 v2; Type 8737: E5-2600 v2 or E5-2600

x240 M5 
 Flex System x240 M5 compute node Type 9532
 Standard-width compute node
 Processors: E5-2600 v4

x440 
 Flex System x440 compute node Type 7167, 7917
 Double-width compute node
 Processors: Type 7917: Xeon E5-4600; Type 7167: E5-4600 v2

x280 X6, x480 X6, and x880 X6 
 IBM Flex System x280 X6, x480 X6, and x880 X6 compute nodes Type 7196, 7903
 Double-width compute node
 Processors: 
 x280 X6 Type 7903: Xeon E7-2800 v2
 x480 X6 Type 7903: Xeon E7-4800 v2; Type 7196: Xeon E7-4800 v3
 x880 X6 Type 7903: Xeon E7-8800 v2; Type 7196: Xeon E7-8800 v3
 Scalability: 
 x280 X6: Does not scale
 x480 X6: Scales up to 4-socket by adding one x480 Compute Node + 4S scalability kit
 x880 X6: Scales up to 4-socket by adding one x880 Compute Node + 4S scalability kit; up to 8-socket by adding three x880 Compute Nodes + 8S scalability kit

Power based 
Compute nodes based on Power ISA-based processors from IBM.

p24L 
 IBM Flex System p24L Compute Node: 1457-7FL
 Standard-width compute node
 Processors: Two IBM POWER7
 16 DIMM sockets
 512 GB using 16x 32 GB DIMMs maximum memory size
 Two I/O connectors for adapters. PCIe 2.0 x16 interface

p260 
 IBM Flex System p260 Compute Node: 7895-22X, 23A, and 23X
 Standard-width compute node
 Processors: Two IBM POWER7 (model 22X) or POWER7+ (models 23A and 23X)
 16 DIMM sockets
 512 GB using 16x 32 GB DIMMs maximum memory size
 Two I/O connectors for adapters. PCIe 2.0 x16 interface

p270 
 IBM Flex System p270 Compute Node: 7954-24X
 Standard-width compute node
 Processors: Two IBM POWER7+
 16 DIMM sockets
 512 GB using 16x 32 GB DIMMs maximum memory size
 Two I/O connectors for adapters. PCIe 2.0 x16 interface

p460 
 IBM Flex System p460 Compute Node: 7895-42X and 43X
 Double-width compute node
 Processors: Four IBM POWER7 (model 42X) or POWER7+ (model 43X)
 32 DIMM sockets
 1 TB using 32x 32 GB DIMMs maximum memory size
 Four I/O connectors for adapters. PCIe 2.0 x16 interface

Software 
Both IBM and its partners provide software which is specifically certified for PureSystems ("Ready for IBM PureSystems ").

Currently, over 125 ISVs have already certified products for PureSystems, and business partners such as system integrators, resellers, distributors, ISVs or MSP can integrate PureSystems into their portfolio.

Miscellaneous 
PureSystems was announced April 11, 2012.

It was mainly assembled at IBM Rochester Campus in Rochester, MN.
But on March 6, 2013, IBM decided to shift production of Power Systems, PureSystems and PureFlex Systems servers to Guadalajara, Mexico from Rochester, Minnesota. After 2014, most systems will be assembled in Mexico.

Videos 
 IBM PureSystems Family Tour with Jason McGee
 What are IBM PureApplication Systems? (Part One)
 IBM PureSystems Product Family - IBM PureData™ System Overview
 IBM PureSystems - PureData System Overview w/Inhi Cho Suh

See also 
 List of IBM products
 IBM AS/400
 System p
 System x
 System z

References

External links 
 Homepage for PureSystems
 Homepage for Smarter Computing
 IBM Redbooks: Overview of IBM PureSystems
 IBM Redbooks: IBM PureFlex System and IBM Flex System Products & Technology 
 IBM Redbooks Product Guides
 Portal IBM PureSystems Centre
 IBM PureSystems - IBM Developerworks
 IBM DeveloperWorks: IBM PureSystems & Rational
 HRG Assessment: Comparing IBM PureSystems and Cisco UCS by Harvard Research Group
 Part I-V: PureSystems, something old, something new, something from big blue Apr, 12 2012 Series of five articles at storageioblog.com

IBM server computers